Hamad Yussuf Masauni (born 3 October 1973) is a Tanzanian CCM politician and Member of Parliament for Kikwajuni constituency since 2010. On 10 January 2022, he was sworn in as the new Minister for Home Affairs.

References

1973 births
Living people
Tanzanian Muslims
Chama Cha Mapinduzi MPs
Tanzanian MPs 2010–2015
Alumni of Northumbria University